La Vie Sur Terre (Life on Earth) is a 1998 Malian comedy/drama film written and directed by, and starring Abderrahmane Sissako. It is set in the village of Sokolo and depicts rural life on the eve of the 21st century. Runtime is 61 minutes. The film was made for the 2000, Seen By... project, initiated by the French company Haut et Court to produce films depicting the approaching turn of the millennium seen from the perspectives of 10 different countries.

The film earned Sissako awards at the Fribourg International Film Festival, the Ouagadougou Panafrican Film and Television Festival and the San Francisco International Film Festival.

References

External links
 

1998 films
Bambara-language films
1998 comedy-drama films
1990s French-language films
Malian comedy films
Films directed by Abderrahmane Sissako
Films set in Mali
Malian drama films
French comedy-drama films
1990s French films